Instructions is the second studio album by American producer and rapper Jermaine Dupri, released by So So Def Recordings and Columbia Records on October 30, 2001. The album debuted at number 15 on the Billboard 200 on November 17, 2001.

Commercial performance
Instructions debuted at number 15 on the Billboard 200 on November 17, 2001.

Track listing
 "LP Intro" – 0:24
 "Welcome to Atlanta" (featuring Ludacris) – 3:20
 "Money, Hoes & Power" (featuring UGK, Pimpin' Ken and Manuel Seal) – 3:50
 "The Dream" (Interlude) [featuring Wanda Sykes] – 0:49
 "Get Some" (featuring Usher, R.O.C., Boo & Gotti) – 2:28
 "Hate" (Interlude) – 1:06
 "Hate Blood" (featuring Jadakiss and Freeway) – 3:55
 "Ballin' Out of Control" (featuring Nate Dogg) – 3:08
 "Superfly" (featuring Bilal) – 3:11
 "Instructions Interlude" – 0:38  
 "Rules of the Game" (feat. Manish Man) – 3:36 
 "Prada Bag" (Interlude) – 0:15 
 "Whatever" (featuring Tigah, R.O.C. and Nate Dogg) – 4:18 
 "Let's Talk About It" (featuring Clipse and Pharrell Williams) – 5:22 
 "Yours & Mine" (featuring Jagged Edge) – 3:25 
 "Jazzy Hoes Part 2" (featuring Kurupt, Too Short, Field Mob, Backbone and Eddie Cain) – 4:47 
 "Hot Mama" (Interlude) – 0:14 
 "You Bring the Freak Out of Me" (featuring Da Brat and Kandi Burruss) – 3:04
 "The Next Morning" (Interlude) – 0:24 
 "Rock with Me" (featuring Xscape) – 4:30
 "Definition of a Pimp" - 3:13

Notes
  Japanese bonus track

Sample credits
"Money, Hoes & Power" contains a sample of "Midnight and You" by Love Unlimited Orchestra.
"Welcome to Atlanta" contains a sample of "Do It Baby" by Redd Holt Unlimited.
"Let's Talk About It" contains a sample of "Rico Suave" by Gerardo.

Charts

Weekly charts

Year-end charts

References

2001 albums
Jermaine Dupri albums
Albums produced by Bryan-Michael Cox
Albums produced by Jermaine Dupri
Albums produced by Swizz Beatz
Albums produced by the Neptunes
Albums produced by Kanye West